Diana Love Webster (née Dill; formerly Douglas and Darrid; January 22, 1923 – July 3, 2015) was an American actress who was known for her marriage to actor Kirk Douglas from 1943 until their divorce in 1951. She was the mother of Michael and Joel Douglas.

In 1942, Douglas began her career as an actress and appeared in more than 50 films. Some of her well-known roles were as Susan Rogers in The Indian Fighter (co-starring Kirk Douglas) and as Peg in Planes, Trains and Automobiles. She was also known for her recurring role as Martha Evans in Days of Our Lives (1977–1979, 1982). In 2003, she appeared in It Runs in the Family with her ex-husband Kirk, her son Michael and her grandson Cameron. She retired from acting in 2008.

Early life 

She was born in Devonshire, Bermuda, on January 22, 1923. Her father, Lieutenant Colonel Thomas Melville Dill (also the name of her great-grandfather, a mariner), was a former Member of the Colonial Parliament (MCP) (representing the Parish of Devonshire in the Parliament of Bermuda), Attorney General of Bermuda, and former Commanding Officer of the Bermuda Militia Artillery. Her mother Ruth Rapalje (née Neilson) had roots in New Jersey, including being a descendant of American Revolutionary War hero Col. John Neilson. Douglas' brother Bayard was a prominent lawyer and politician. Her sister Ruth was married to John Seward Johnson I, heir to the Johnson & Johnson fortune. Douglas' father was from a prominent Bermudian family, present on the island since the early 17th century.

Her ancestry included English, Irish, Welsh, Dutch, Scottish, Belgian and French. Douglas was brought up in the Church of England.

Career 

In 1942, she began her career in a minor, uncredited role in Keeper of the Flame. She went on to appear in many films during the 1950s and 1960s, one of her most notable roles arguably being Susan Rogers in The Indian Fighter. During the 1960s and 1970s, she appeared in a variety of television programs (such as the General Electric Theater and Naked City), her best known television role being Lily Chernak Donnelly on Love Is a Many Splendored Thing.

She played Poco on Three Steps to Heaven and Martha Evans in Days of Our Lives. Following the cancellation of Love Is a Many Splendored Thing, she played Annie Andersen in The Cowboys. She appeared in Roots: The Next Generations and The Waltons. In It Runs in the Family, Douglas appeared with her former husband, Kirk Douglas, son Michael and grandson Cameron, and later appeared on an episode of CBS's Cold Case and in the Season 15 ER episode "Heal Thyself" (2008), the year that she retired from acting.

In 1999, her autobiography, In the Wings: A Memoir, was published.

Personal life 
Dill was married to Kirk Douglas. They met as acting students before the Second World War. During the war, Douglas was serving in the U.S. Navy when he saw the May 3, 1943, issue of Life magazine, with a photograph of Dill on the cover. He showed the cover to his shipmates and told them that he would marry her. They married on November 2, 1943, and had two sons, Michael and Joel, before divorcing in 1951.

She married actor Bill Darrid, and they lived with her sons on the East Coast of the US until his death in 1992. In 2002, she married Donald Webster in the old Devonshire Parish Church in Bermuda.

Death 
On July 3, 2015, Douglas, a breast cancer survivor, died at the Motion Picture & Television Country House and Hospital in Woodland Hills, Los Angeles, of an undisclosed form of cancer at the age of 92.

Filmography

Film

Television

Books

References

External links 

 
 
 
 

1923 births
2015 deaths
American Academy of Dramatic Arts alumni
Bermudian actresses
Bermudian Anglicans
Bermudian emigrants to the United States
Deaths from cancer in California
Douglas family
People from Devonshire Parish
People with acquired American citizenship
Dill family